Jonathan Harold Sullivan (10 November 1950 – 17 January 2021) was an Australian politician who served as a member of the Australian House of Representatives from 2007 to 2010, representing the seat of Longman for the Australian Labor Party. He had also previously served as a member of the Legislative Assembly of Queensland from 1989 to 1998, representing the seat of Glass House from 1989 to 1992, and Caboolture from 1992 to 1998.

Sullivan won the seat of Longman for the Labor Party from the Liberal Party at the 2007 federal election. Sullivan defeated government minister Mal Brough. It was one of a number of Labor gains at that election which propelled the party from opposition to government. However, the seat was returned to the Liberal National Party of Queensland at the 2010 election, when Sullivan was defeated by 20-year-old candidate, Wyatt Roy.

In the closing week of the 2010 federal election campaign, Sullivan gained national media attention due to a gaffe where he criticised the father of a seven-year-old child with a disability for waiting two years on a Queensland Health waiting list. Sullivan apologised to the father and his family.

Before entering federal politics, Sullivan was a member of the Legislative Assembly of Queensland. He was the Labor member for Caboolture from 1989 to 1998. He lost the seat to Bill Feldman, the One Nation candidate at the 1998 Queensland state election.

His wife, Carryn Sullivan, also an Australian politician, was also a member of the Legislative Assembly of Queensland, representing between 2001 and 2012 the seat of Pumicestone for Labor.

References

External links
Archive of personal web site

1950 births
2021 deaths
Australian Labor Party members of the Parliament of Australia
Members of the Australian House of Representatives for Longman
Members of the Australian House of Representatives
Members of the Queensland Legislative Assembly
21st-century Australian politicians